Iceberg A-74 is an iceberg that calved from the north side of the Antarctic Brunt Ice Shelf in February 2021. Its calving had been anticipated due to large ice rifts that opened up in September 2019 and spread in the Antarctic summer of 2020–21. The iceberg measured  soon after calving. It has moved away from the Antarctic coast which allowed, on 13–14 March 2021, the research vessel Polarstern to complete a circumnavigation as part of a research expedition.

Calving 
The calving of the iceberg was much anticipated due to large rifts in the ice that appeared in September 2019, in the vicinity of the McDonald Ice Rumples.  The rift spread very rapidly across part of the Brunt Ice Shelf in summer 2020–21.

GPS equipment belonging to the British Antarctic Survey (BAS) first reported that the iceberg had calved on 26 February. The GPS receivers are maintained by researchers at the nearby BAS Halley Research Station. The GPS units had been raised above the snow in January and February 2021 as part of regular maintenance.

The calving was confirmed by the American National Ice Center (NIC) the following day, using imagery from the Sentinel-1A satellite.  The NIC named the iceberg A-74 in accordance with its naming conventions.

It was considered large for an iceberg originating from Brunt, being the largest to calve in this sector since 1971. The Eastern Weddell Sea region is less affected by global warming than the Western portion. The calving of A-74 is part of the natural ice cycle and not attributed to global warming. On 1 March the cloud cover thinned sufficiently to allow NASA to capture a natural colour image of the iceberg using the Operational Land Imager aboard Landsat 8.

Potential course
The calving of A-74 may affect other rifts at Brunt including the "Halloween Crack" and "Chasm-1", features that may lead to further calving events and possibly threaten the Halley Research Station. A-74 is expected to be captured by the Weddell Gyre and follow a similar path to Iceberg A-68.

On 10 June 2022, the USNIC announced that A-74 had calved into A-74A and A-74B. At that time, A-74 had drifted  westward from the Brunt Ice Shelf since March 2021.

Polarstern expedition 

On the weekend of 13–14 March 2021 the German Alfred Wegener Institute for Polar and Marine Research vessel Polarstern completed a circumnavigation of the iceberg. It had been positioned nearby on an unrelated research expedition when the iceberg calved and was diverted to carry out an investigation. As the iceberg moves offshore parts of the seabed and water column are being exposed to sunlight, wind and temperature changes for the first time in 50 years. The movement of A-74 provides an opportunity for scientists to study the seafloor and organisms that are remote from light and food sources. Polarstern gathered more than 1,000 seafloor images and long videos of the seafloor in a five-hour operation. A large number of largely filter-feeding, sessile animals were discovered as well as some mobile fauna including five species of fish, two of octopus and a number of sea cucumbers, brittle stars and molluscs. The study shows that a good supply of food, carried by ocean currents, can reach areas located even  from the nearest daylight. It is hoped that the Polarstern can return to study the seafloor at regular intervals to document changes to the ecosystem caused by the calving.

References

A-74
2021 in Antarctica